J.C. Love Field at Pat Patterson Park is a baseball stadium in Ruston, Louisiana, United States.  It is the home field of the Louisiana Tech University Bulldogs college baseball team.

History

The facility features a seating capacity of 2,100 much of which is chairback seating. Prior to the 2016 season, artificial field turf was installed to replace the natural grass playing surface. The ballpark also boasts large picnic and viewing areas beyond the outfield wall that are very popular with Tech fans and the "Right Field Rowdies" cheering section. In 1997, a then school-record of 3,251 fans attended the Bulldogs' game against eventual national champion LSU.

On May 22, 2008, the facility was rededicated as J.C. Love Field at Pat Patterson Park in honor of Tech legend Pat Patterson.

The stadium was the sight of one of the greatest comebacks in college baseball history during the 2006 season. Down 12–6 with two outs in the bottom of the 9th to #3 Mississippi State, Tech scored seven runs on eight singles and one walk to win the game 13–12.

On March 15, 2017, a new attendance record was set in a game against the Louisiana Ragin' Cajuns, at 3,311

Rebuild

During the early morning hours of April 25, 2019, an EF-3 tornado destroyed the facility, deeming it unplayable for the remainder of the season. The 2020 season will be played at Ruston High's baseball field.

The stadium was demolished during the spring of 2020 and construction began on a new stadium in the summer of 2020.

The first game at the new J.C. Love Field at Pat Patterson Park was Friday, February 26, 2021. Tech beat Southern University 9–2. Fans were not allowed inside the stadium due to ongoing construction, but hundreds watched from beyond the left field wall.

Total capacity of the facility is 2,100. There is a fixed seating capacity of 1,322 permanent chair back seats, as well as a first base turf berm area for fans to bring chairs.  Extending down the right field line is an area for tailgate tents and there is also a grass berm beyond the right field fence that is the home of the Kennel, the student section.
 
The stadium walls are all padded in Tech blue.  The outfield wall varies in height with it being 12’ in left field and dropping to 8’ in right center (315’ left, 380’ center, 325’ right).
 
The pressbox level features four suites, a radio booth for both home and visiting teams, scoreboard productions, TV production and a booth for the writing press.
 
The scoreboard is a Daktronics scoreboard featuring both a video screen and a fixed digit scoreboard.  There is an additional auxiliary scoreboard in the stands so the fans in the outfield can see the game updates.

Notable Games

In the new re-built J.C. Love Field at Pat Patterson Park, the Bulldogs have tallied wins over the #1 ranked Arkansas Razorbacks and the #4 ranked Ole Miss Rebels.

Louisiana Tech hosted an NCAA Division I regional for the first time June 4–6, 2021. North Carolina State won the regional championship, defeating Alabama once and Tech twice.

Tournaments Hosted
Conference Tournaments: 2021 (CUSA)
NCAA Regional Tournaments: 2021

Attendance Records
 Top 10 Largest Crowds at J.C. Love Field at Pat Patterson Park

See also
 List of NCAA Division I baseball venues

References

External links
J.C. Love Field at Pat Patterson Park

Baseball venues in Louisiana
College baseball venues in the United States
Louisiana Tech Bulldogs baseball
Sports venues in Ruston, Louisiana
Buildings and structures in Lincoln Parish, Louisiana
Sports venues completed in 1971
1971 establishments in Louisiana